This is a list of court shows. Court shows are television programs where court cases are heard and ruled on by a judge or jury. Court shows are particularly popular on daytime syndication.

A
America's Court with Judge Ross

B
The Blame Game

C
Caso Cerrado
Caught in Providence
Couples Court with The Cutlers
Court of Current Issues
Crime & Punishment
Crown Court
Curtis Court
La Corte de Familia
La Corte del Pueblo

D
Day Court
Divorce Court
Due Process

F
Family Court with Judge Penny

G
Gary Busey: Pet Judge
Guilty or Not Guilty
Guy Court

H
Hot Bench

J
Judge Alex
Judge's Court
Judge David Young
Jury Duty
Judge Faith
Judge for Yourself
Judge Hatchett
Judge Jeanine Pirro
Judge Jerry
Judge Joe Brown
Judge John Deed
Judge Judy
Judge Karen
Judge Mathis
Judge Maria Lopez
Judge Mills Lane
Judge Rinder
Judge Romesh
Judge Steve Harvey
Judge Wapner's Animal Court
Judy Justice
Justice for All with Judge Cristina Perez
Justice with Judge Jeanine
The Judge

K
Kids Court

L
Last Shot with Judge Gunn
Lauren Lake's Paternity Court
The Law Firm

M
Murder, Mystery and My Family

P
 Paternity Court
 Perry Mason
 The People's Court
 Power of Attorney
   Protection Court
 Public Atorni: Asunto o Areglo

S
Sans aucun doute
Science Court
Sex Court
Street Court
Superior Court (TV series)
Swift Justice with Jackie Glass
Swift Justice with Nancy Grace

T
 Texas Justice
 Trial and Error
 The Trial: A Murder in the Family
 Tribunal (upcoming 3-judge panel court show for Amazon Freevee)

V
The Verdict
The Verdict Is Yours

W
We the People with Gloria Allred/Lauren Lake

References

Court